Artemios Matthaiopoulos (Greek: Αρτέμης Ματθαιόπουλος; born 14 March 1984, Thessaloniki) is a Greek politician and convicted criminal, former  member of parliament for Golden Dawn for Serres. Before entering politics, he was a member of the Nazi punk band "Pogrom" and once sang of wanting to burn down the Greek parliament and killing immigrants who did not speak Greek. His neo-Nazism led to protests from the Greek Jewish community when he was elected.

References

External links
 

1984 births
Living people
Golden Dawn (political party) politicians
Greek MPs 2012–2014
Politicians from Thessaloniki
Greek MPs 2015 (February–August)
Greek neo-Nazis
Musicians from Thessaloniki
Antisemitism in Greece